The Kaïd, A Moroccan Chief is an Orientalist oil on canvas painting by the French artist Eugène Delacroix, signed and dated by the painter himself in 1837, and now in the Musée d'Arts de Nantes It is also known as Offering Milk, Arab Chief Among His Tribe and The Halt, or The Kaïd Accepting the Shepherds' Hospitality

It was inspired by the artist's stop-off in Ksar el-Kebir on 9 April 1832, during which he witnessed a peaceful greeting by a Moroccan chief. The work was exhibited at the Paris Salon in 1838 and then in Nantes the following year, leading the town's art museum to buy it.

References

Orientalist paintings
1837 paintings
Paintings by Eugène Delacroix
Horses in art
Paintings in the collection of the Musée d'Arts de Nantes
Flags in art
Goats in art